Zur Rose Group, headquartered in Frauenfeld, is an active Swiss-based group operating primarily in Europe online pharmacy and pharma wholesaling. Zur Rose Group is the self proclaimed largest e-commerce pharmacy in Europe, operating in Switzerland, Germany, the  Netherlands, Spain and France. Its services are offered under different brands in different countries, DocMorris being the most well known one. The Zur Rose Group shares are listed on the SIX Swiss Exchange.

History 
Zur Rose was founded in 1993 by the present Chairman of the Board of Directors Walter Oberhänsli and a group of medical doctors as wholesale suppliers for self-dispensing doctors in Switzerland. The company name derived from the house Zur Rose in Steckborn, Switzerland, where still a brick-and-mortar pharmacy is located. In 1999, the company moved from Steckborn to its current headquarters in Frauenfeld.

In 2012, Zur Rose acquired Europe’s largest online pharmacy DocMorris and in 2019 with medpex the third-largest online pharmacy of Germany. Further acquisitions in pharma logistics and online commerce were Ogera AG (2001), Helvepharm AG (2006), DocMorris (2012), Eurapon Pharmahandel GmbH (2017), Promofarma (2018) and apo-rot (2018). In 2009 The pharmaceutical company Helvepharm AG was sold to Sanofi Aventis. The group also acquired two software companies; BlueCare AG (2015) and TeleClinic (2020), a telemedicine provider.

Zur Rose Group IPOed on the SIX Swiss Exchange on July 6, 2017.

Since 2017 Zur Rose Group operates in Switzerland a small number of physical shop-in-shop stores in collaboration with Switzerland's largest retailer Migros.

Brands 

Zur Rose Group operates under the following brands:
 DocMorris
 Zur Rose
 medpex
 eurapon
 Apo-rot
 apotal.de
 TeleClinic
 eHealthTec
 BlueCare
 PromoFarma
 DoctiPharma

See also 
 Deutscher Apothekerverband v 0800 DocMorris NV

References

External links 
 

Companies listed on the SIX Swiss Exchange
Pharmaceutical companies of Switzerland
Logistics companies of Switzerland
Swiss companies established in 1993